The Porter's Bar Site  is a Pre-Columbian archaeological site in Eastpoint, Florida. It is located two miles northeast of Eastpoint off U.S. 98/319. On January 23, 1975, it was added to the U.S. National Register of Historic Places.

References

External links
 Franklin County listings at National Register of Historic Places
 Franklin County listings at Florida's Office of Cultural and Historical Programs

Native American history of Florida
Geography of Franklin County, Florida
Archaeological sites on the National Register of Historic Places in Florida
National Register of Historic Places in Franklin County, Florida